Zalishchyky Raion was a raion of the Ternopil Oblast.  The administrative centre and largest town was Zalishchyky. The rest of the district's population lived in one of 35 village councils or 53 rural settlements. The raion was abolished on 18 July 2020 as part of the administrative reform of Ukraine, which reduced the number of raions of Ternopil Oblast to three. The area of Zalishchyky Raion was merged into Chortkiv Raion. The last estimate of the raion population was

Subdivisions
At the time of disestablishment, the raion consisted of two hromadas:
 Tovste settlement hromada with the administration in the urban-type settlement of Tovste;
 Zalishchyky urban hromada with the administration in Zalishchyky.

Demographics 
 Population: 53,400 (2001)
 (In 1989 the population was 56,300 – a decline of 5%)
 Density: 85
 Life expectancy: 71
 % Urban population: 25%

Geography 
 Area: 684 km²

Communities 

Towns
 Zalishchyky
Urban type settlements
Tovste
Villages
 
 Anhelivka
 Bedrykivtsi
 Berestok
 Blyshchanka
 Buriakivka
 Dobrivliany
 Dorohychivka
 Duniv
 Duplyska
 Dzvyniach
 Hlushka
 Holihrady
 Holovchyntsi
 Horodok
 Hynkivtsi
 Ivane-Zolote
 Kasperivtsi
 Khartonivtsi
 Khmeleva
 Kolodribka
 Korolivka
 Koshylivtsi
 Kulakivtsi
 Lysivtsi
 Lysychnyky
 Lytiachi
 Myshkiv
 Nahoriany
 Novosilka
 Nyrkiv
 Pechorna
 Podillia
 Popivtsi
 Rozhanivka
 Sadky
 Shchytivtsi
 Shutromyntsi
 Shypivtsi
 Slobidka
 Solone
 Stavky
 Svershkivtsi
 Synkiv
 Torske
 Uhrynkivtsi
 Ustechko
 Vorvulyntsi
 Vyhoda
 Vyniatyntsi
 Vynohradne
 Yakubivka
 Zelenyi Hai
 Zozulyntsi

References

Former raions of Ternopil Oblast
1940 establishments in Ukraine
Ukrainian raions abolished during the 2020 administrative reform